Robert (Bob) Kennedy (born 1962) is an American chemist specializing in bioanalytical chemistry including liquid chromatography, capillary electrophoresis, and microfluidics. He is currently the Hobart H. Willard Distinguished University Professor of Chemistry and the Chair of the Department of Chemistry at the University of Michigan. He holds joint appointments with the Department of Pharmacology and Department Macromolecular Science and Engineering. Kennedy is an Associate Editor of Analytical Chemistry.

Early life and education 
Kennedy was born on November 11, 1962, in Sault Ste. Marie, Michigan. He earned a Bachelor of Science degree in Chemistry at the University of Florida in 1984 and a Ph.D. from the University of North Carolina-Chapel Hill (UNC) in 1988 while working under James Jorgenson. He was an NSF post-doctoral fellow at UNC from 1989-1991 with R. Mark Wightman.

Academic career and research interests 
Kennedy became a professor of chemistry at the University of Florida in 1991. After 11 years, he moved to the University of Michigan. He has graduated approximately 70 graduate students. Kennedy’s research focuses on developing analytical instrumentation and methods that can help solve biological problems. He is considered a leader in the field of analytical chemistry, and an expert in endocrinology, neurochemistry, and high-throughput analysis. Major contributions to analytical chemistry include affinity probe capillary electrophoresis, in vivo neurochemical measurements, and ultra-high pressure liquid chromatography. He has been an Lilly Analytical Research Fellow, Alfred P. Sloan Fellow, NSF Presidential Faculty Fellow, and AAAS Fellow.

Honors and awards 
 Martin Medal (2019)
 Ralph N. Adams Award in Bioanalyical Chemistry (2016)
 ACS Award in Chromatography (2017) 
 CASSS Award for Outstanding Achievements in Separation Science (2017)
 Marcel Golay Award for Lifetime Achievement in Capillary Chromatography (2012) 
 Eastern Analytical Symposium Award for Separation Science (2012)  
 McKnight Award for Technical Innovations in Neuroscience (2010)
 Rackham Distinguished Faculty Achievement Award (2009)
 American Microchemical Society’s Benedetti-Pichler Memorial Award (2001)

References 

American chemists
University of Michigan faculty
Electrophoresis
Chromatography
1962 births
Living people
University of Florida alumni
University of North Carolina at Chapel Hill alumni
Fellows of the American Association for the Advancement of Science
Recipients of the Presidential Early Career Award for Scientists and Engineers